Rockin’ Down the Highway: The Wildlife Concert is the second double live album by American rock band The Doobie Brothers, released in 1996 (see 1996 in music). The concerts were performed to benefit the Wildlife Conservation Society, hence the album's title.

The album marked the first appearance on a Doobie Brothers album of guitarist John McFee and drummer Keith Knudsen since rejoining the group in 1993 after an eleven-year absence. Two other former members also appeared - keyboardist/singer/songwriter Michael McDonald performed on three tracks he had written and sung during his time with the group while saxophonist/keyboardist Cornelius Bumpus, who had been a member in the early 1980s, featured as a sidesman.

Two tracks had not previously appeared on the group's albums. Slow Burn was a new track while Wild Ride had been on Patrick Simmons' solo album Take Me to the Highway released the same year.

Track listing
Disc 1
"Dangerous" (Patrick Simmons) – 5:58
"Jesus Is Just Alright" (Arthur Reid Reynolds) – 4:51
"Take Me in Your Arms (Rock Me a Little While)" (Holland-Dozier-Holland) – 3:48
"Slow Burn" (Tom Johnston, John McFee, Keith Knudsen, Michael Hossack) – 4:44
"Dependin' on You" (Simmons, Michael McDonald) – 4:13
"Another Park, Another Sunday" (Johnston) – 5:04
"The Doctor" (Johnston, Charlie Midnight, Eddie Schwartz) – 4:31
"Slack Key Soquel Rag" (Simmons) – 1:59
"South City Midnight Lady" (Simmons) – 5:37
"Eyes of Silver" (Johnston) – 3:12
"Black Water" (Simmons) – 4:32
"Takin' It to the Streets" (McDonald) – 4:42

Disc 2
"Rockin' Down the Highway" (Johnston) – 3:28
"Minute by Minute" (McDonald, Lester Abrams) – 4:22
"Wild Ride" (Simmons, Midnight) – 3:54
"China Grove" (Johnston) – 4:02
"Dark Eyed Cajun Woman" (Johnston) – 5:58
"Neal's Fandango" (Simmons) – 3:27
"Without You" (Johnston) – 6:45
"Clear as the Driven Snow" (Simmons) – 5:22
"Excited" (Johnston, Jerry Lynn Williams) – 5:30
"What a Fool Believes" (McDonald, Kenny Loggins) – 3:54
"Long Train Runnin'" (Johnston) – 5:55
"Listen to the Music" (Johnston) – 5:29

Personnel
The Doobie Brothers

Tom Johnston - lead and backing vocals, guitars
Patrick Simmons - lead and backing vocals, guitars
John McFee - backing vocals, guitars, slide guitar, pedal steel guitar, violin
Michael Hossack - drums
Keith Knudsen - backing vocals, drums

Former Doobie Brothers appearing as guests

Michael McDonald - lead vocals and keyboards on "Takin' It to the Streets", "Minute by Minute" and "What a Fool Believes"
Cornelius Bumpus -  backing vocals, lead vocal on "Jesus Is Just Alright", saxophones, flute, keyboards

Additional personnel

Skylark - backing vocals, bass
Danny Hull - backing vocals, saxophones, harmonica, keyboards, percussion
Dale Ockerman - backing vocals, keyboards, guitar
Guy Allison - keyboards
Carlos Guaico - backing vocals, percussion
Buck Johnson - backing vocals, percussion

Production
Producers: Charlie Midnight, The Doobie Brothers
Executive Producers: Jeff Jones, Andy Kadison
Engineer: John Harris
Assistant Engineer: Tom Cadley
Mastering: Gavin Lurssen, Doug Sax
Mixing: Joel Soyffer
Mixing Assistant: Joe Warlick
Photography: Danny Clinch
Design: Erwin Gorostiza
Art Direction: Erwin Gorostiza

References

Notes

The Doobie Brothers live albums
1996 live albums
Sony Music live albums